Pranav Sivakumar is an American speller and amateur researcher. In 2013, he finished second in the 86th Scripps National Spelling Bee, finished second in the Illinois State Geography Bee, and was named a Siemens Competition National Semifinalist.  His National Spelling Bee achievements earned him recognition by Pat Quinn, who declared June 8, 2014 "Pranav Sivakumar Day." In 2014 he was admitted as a student at the Illinois Mathematics and Science Academy, where he graduated in 2017. He currently attends UC Berkeley. He was the first person to be a Google Science Fair Global Finalist twice and won the Virgin Galactic Pioneer Award in 2015. Pranav was mentioned in President Barack Obama's speech at the White House Astronomy Night. Sivakumar was named the $20,000 individual winner of the 2016 Siemens Competition National Finals.

Childhood

Sivakumar's aspirations to learn more about astronomy started when he found an encyclopedia on famous scientists lying around the house when he was six years old. Since then, his parents made an hour commute every weekend to drive him to an astrophysics lab where he could attend the 'Ask-A-Scientist' class. Many years later, he teamed up with scientists he met there to study the gravitational lensing of quasars.

References

American spellers
Living people
2000 births